Jambu or jumbu may refer to:

 Jambuswami (543-449 BCE), Jain monk
 Jambu, a Malay/Indonesian term for various fruits, including:
 jambu air, Syzygium aqueum (Watery rose apple)
 jambu batu, guava
 jambu bol, Syzygium malaccense (Malay rose apple)
 jambu semarang, Syzygium samarangense (wax apple)
 Jambul or jambu tree, Syzygium cumini
 Jambu, a Brazilian term for the herb Acmella oleracea
 Jambu fruit dove, a species of fruit dove (bird)
 Jambudvipa, the terrestrial world in some eastern cosmologies
 Jambu, an orca in the South Park episode "Free Willzyx"
 Jambu (film), a Tamil film released in 1980, see list of Tamil films of 1980
 Jambulingam (director), Indian film director, see Apna Desh or Miss Mary